Area codes 084 and 086 are Nigerian telephone area codes serving the cities of Port Harcourt and Ahoada in Rivers State. They fall under the Southeast Zone in the National Numbering Plan (NNP) restructured in 2003.

When in Port Harcourt or Ahoada, only the six-digit phone number is required for local calls, but to call the cities from elsewhere within the NNP, simply dial 084 or 086 followed by the subscriber's phone number. From other countries the international call prefix used in the originating country must be dialled before 234 + 84 + six digit phone number. For example, a call placed from Mexico to Port Harcourt would be dialled as 00 + 234 + 84 + six digit phone number.

References

External links
National Numbering Plan, Nigeria

Communications in Rivers State
Telephone numbers in Nigeria